Jérôme Policand (born 1 October 1964 in Grenoble) is a French racing driver.
He drove in Le Mans Series Championship and the 24 Hours of Le Mans in GT1 class for the Team Luc Alphand Aventures. He is currently the team principal of French Blancpain GT Series team AKKA ASP.

24 Hours of Le Mans results

References

External links
 
 

1964 births
Living people
Sportspeople from Grenoble
French racing drivers
Formula Ford drivers
French Formula Three Championship drivers
British Formula 3000 Championship drivers
International Formula 3000 drivers
24 Hours of Le Mans drivers
European Le Mans Series drivers
24 Hours of Daytona drivers
IMSA GT Championship drivers
FIA GT Championship drivers
American Le Mans Series drivers
Rolex Sports Car Series drivers
Porsche Supercup drivers
International GT Open drivers
Blancpain Endurance Series drivers

DAMS drivers